The list of ancient roofs comprises roof constructions from Greek and Roman architecture ordered by  clear span. Roof constructions increased in clear span as Greek and Roman engineering improved. Most buildings in classical Greece were covered by traditional prop-and-lintel constructions, which often needed to include interior colonnades. In Sicily, truss roofs presumably appeared as early as 550 BC. Their potential was fully realized in the Roman period which saw over 30 m wide trussed roofs spanning the rectangular spaces of monumental public buildings such as temples, basilicas, and later churches. Such spans were thrice as large as the widest prop-and-lintel roofs and only superseded by the largest Roman domes.

Greek roofing

Roman roofing

See also 
Record-holding roofs in antiquity
Ancient Greek architecture
Ancient Roman architecture
List of Ancient Greek temples

References

Sources

Further reading

External links
Traianus – Technical investigation of Roman public works

Ancient Greek architecture
Roof
Ancient Roman architectural elements
Ancient Roman temples
Ancient basilicas in Rome
Basilicas

History of construction
Roofs
Timber framing
Roofs